Dhrushant Soni (born 9 October 1995) is an Indian cricketer. He made his List A debut on 9 October 2019, for Railways in the 2019–20 Vijay Hazare Trophy. He made his Twenty20 debut on 10 January 2021, for Railways in the 2020–21 Syed Mushtaq Ali Trophy.

References

External links
 

1995 births
Living people
Indian cricketers
Railways cricketers
Place of birth missing (living people)